The Portland Timbers–Vancouver Whitecaps rivalry is a soccer rivalry between the Portland Timbers and Vancouver Whitecaps FC, both based in the Cascadia region of United States and Canada. The rivalry originated in the North American Soccer League of the 1970s, and later carried into successor leagues through the 1980s and the 2000s, including the A-League and USL First Division, with both cities reviving expansion teams. The rivalry moved to Major League Soccer, the top division of soccer in the United States, in 2011, where it has grown into one of the largest in North American soccer.

The two clubs are part of the Cascadia Cup, the trophy and competition created in 2004 by supporters of the Portland Timbers, Vancouver Whitecaps, and the Seattle Sounders which is awarded each season to the best top-flight soccer team in the Cascadia region. Vancouver won the inaugural Cup, defeating Portland three times in 2004. The Timbers and Whitecaps have antagonistic roots dating to the days of the original North American Soccer League beginning in 1975. The rivalry regained steam as Portland and Vancouver clashed in crucial, and often physical matches during the late 2000s, with the clubs facing each other in memorable playoff duels in 2007, 2009, and 2010. The two clubs played for the 100th time in 2017, and the rivalry is one of the most-played in US soccer history. 

In the first decade of the two clubs playing in Major League Soccer together, Portland and Vancouver have a friendlier rivalry than that of other match-ups in the Cascadia Cup, such as Portland and Seattle. One reason for the less-intense rivalry for the time being could be simple geography (Portland is closer to Seattle than Vancouver) or Vancouver not attaining a similar level of sustained MLS success as the two other Cascadia clubs. However, individual matches between the sides have been just as intense as any rivalry in the league, such as when Portland defeated Vancouver in a brutal two-game playoff series on their way to winning the 2015 MLS Cup. Additionally, many Whitecap players point to the Timbers being their biggest rival.

History

Statistics

NASL era (1975–82)
The original Vancouver Whitecaps were founded in December 1973 and began to play in the North American Soccer League (NASL) in 1974. Portland was subsequently granted an expansion team the next year, the Timbers, and in 1975 the clubs played their first match against each other, with Portland winning 2–0 in the initial game on May 16, 1975.

Both the Timbers and the Whitecaps achieved success in the beginning years of the league, with Portland winning the regular season title in 1975 and making the Soccer Bowl while Vancouver won the championship in 1979. Due to the success of both teams and the natural proximity of the two towns, Portland and Vancouver developed a rivalry.

The rivalry got off to an auspicious start, with Portland winning the first six games. However Vancouver came straight back, winning the next five and only losing three additional times to the Timbers during the duration of NASL play. 

In 1978, Vancouver was the top-ranked club in the league heading into the playoffs, with a record of 24–6. They won their first round game but were upset by the Timbers in the playoffs, who won both games in route to a 3–1 aggregate goal margin. Clyde Best scored in both games in the first playoff confrontation between the teams. 

Portland folded its team at the end of the 1982 season, as player salaries outpaced team revenue. The original Vancouver Whitecaps also folded along with the NASL in 1984.

WSL/WSA era (1987–1990)
Portland regained a soccer club in 1985 with the formation of F.C. Portland, who joined the Western Alliance Challenge Series. In 1986, Portland joined the Western Soccer Alliance, while at the same time the Vancouver franchise was reborn in the Canadian Soccer League (CSL), where they were immediately successful. The two clubs began to play matches against each other in 1987–with F.C. Portland becoming the second side to take the Timbers name in 1989–and continued until Portland folded in 1990.

USL era (2001–2010)

In 2001, the third incarnation of the Portland Timbers was established and the club joined the USL First Division (USL-1), which already contained the Vancouver Whitecaps. The first game between the rivals in over a decade came on June 13, 2001, with Portland's Vadim Tolstolutsky scoring in the 90th minute to salvage a tie for the Timbers after neither side scored in extra time.

In the first playoff series between the two clubs in 24 years, Portland and Vancouver faced off in the first round of the 2002 A-League playoffs. Vancouver won both games 1-0 to advance to the next round. 

In 2004, fan-based organizations supporting the Portland Timbers and Vancouver Whitecaps as well as the Seattle Sounders sponsored the creation of a two-foot-tall silver cup to be awarded annually to the club that finishes with the best record in the season series between the three rivals.

The Whitecaps dominated the series during the mid-2000s, not losing to the Timbers in league play for over 3 years between May 2004 and July 2007. 

The Portland-Vancouver rivalry reached new heights near the end of the 2000s after Portland knocked Vancouver out of the USL playoffs in 2007, only for the Whitecaps to return the favor twice, delivering a death blow to the Timbers' postseason runs in both 2009 and 2010. In the 2009 season, Portland was the top-ranked club in the league but fell to Vancouver in a dramatic two-game series that the Whitecaps won 5-4 on aggregate.

Portland fell behind defending champions Vancouver in the first game of the 2007 USL playoff opening round 1-0. However, on the return leg, the Timbers ran right through the Whitecaps, advancing with a 3-0 win and a 3-1 total goal advantage on aggregate. This was the first time Portland had advanced past the first round of the A-League or USL playoffs, in what was described as "an intense and offensive contest between the Northwest rivals".

In 2009 and 2010, supporters of the Timbers and Whitecaps decided to continue the Cascadia Cup without the Sounders while playing in the USL, after Seattle moved to Major League Soccer in 2009. Timbers and Whitecaps supporters voted to only included regular season USL-1 matches played between the teams and Portland won the cup for the first time.

Portland and Vancouver faced each other once again in the 2009 USL playoffs, this time in the second round. Portland was the top overall team in the league in 2009, compiling a 16-4-10 W-L-D record, while Vancouver was the lowest-seeded team to make the playoffs. Vancouver won the first game of the two-game playoff series 2-1 at Swangard Stadium in Burnaby, BC, meaning that the Timbers would need to win at home in order to advance. Portland nearly fought back to equalize overall but second-half goals from Martin Nash and Marlon James forced a 3-3 tie at PGE Park, and the Timbers never scored again, giving Vancouver the win 5-4 on goal aggregate.

In 2010, the final year of both clubs playing in USL, they met again in the playoffs, this time in the first round with Portland as the 4th seed and Vancouver as the 5th seed. On October 7, 2010, in the first leg of the matchup, Gershon Koffie scored in the first minute and Martin Nash added a 13th minute strike to give the Whitecaps a 2-0 win at Swangard Stadium. Three days later, on the return leg in Portland, James Marcelin scored for the Timbers in the 49th minute, but Portland was not able to find the equalizer, and Vancouver advanced to the next round with a 2-1 aggregate win, their second straight season eliminating Portland in the playoffs.

MLS era (2011–present)

The Vancouver franchise was granted status on March 18, 2009 by MLS Commissioner Don Garber as the seventeenth franchise of Major League Soccer. The Portland Timbers were announced as the eighteenth franchise two days later, and the two Cascadia clubs joined MLS together for the 2011 MLS season. The Timbers won the initial MLS game against the Whitecaps, and it would take until 2014 for Vancouver to first win against Portland. 

The two clubs met for the first time in the MLS Playoffs in a two game aggregate series in the 2015 Western Conference Semifinals. After the first game tied 0-0 at Portland's Providence Park, the Timbers won the return match at BC Place 2-0 on goals by Fanendo Adi and Diego Chara, advancing to the Western Conference Finals. The Timbers would later win the 2015 MLS Cup, becoming the first team from Cascadia to do so. 

On August 10, 2019, Portland defeated the Whitecaps 3–1, placing them first in Cascadia Cup standings. Goals were scored by Sebastián Blanco, Marvin Loría, and Jeremy Ebobisse.

Due to the COVID-19 disruption of MLS play as well as cross-border restrictions imposed by the Canadian government, Vancouver played the entirety of their 2020 home matches against American teams at Portland's Providence Park in a way to easier facilitate travel accommodations. The first "home" match for Vancouver coincidentally was against the Timbers, who played as the away side in their own park. Portland won 1-0, scoring an official away goal by Felipe Mora in the 5th minute.

In 2021, Vancouver continued to play in the United States, but at Real Salt Lake's own Rio Tinto Stadium given the continuing cross-border travel restrictions that continues to prevent Vancouver from playing their home matches in Canada. Vancouver played as the home team against Portland on April 18, 2021 in Rio Tinto Stadium where they won the match 1–0.

MLS Honours

Supporter groups
Both clubs have a strong history of supporter groups that connect and promote the rivalry. Portland's supporting group is the Timbers Army while Vancouver's is the Vancouver Southsiders. The two groups, along with the Emerald City Supporters of Seattle, jointly created the Cascadia Cup in 2004.

Members of the supporting groups between the two clubs even jointly celebrated together after Vancouver eliminated Portland from the 2010 USL Playoffs due to the shared move to MLS the next year.

Results
Home team is listed on the left, away team is listed on the right. Home team's score is listed first.

League

North American Soccer League (1975–1982)

WSL/WSA (1987–1990)

A-League (2001–05)

USL (2005–10)

Major League Soccer (2011–present)

Playoffs

NASL (1975–1982)
1978 Semi-finals

A-League (2001–05)
2002 First round

USL (2005–10)
2007 Quarter-finals

2009 Semi-finals

D2 Pro (2010)
2010 Quarter-finals

MLS (2011–present)
2015 Semi-finals

Notable friendlies

Western Conference standings finishes

• Total: Portland with 7 higher finishes, Vancouver with 3.

See also

 Cascadia Cup
 Cascadia (bioregion)
 Portland Timbers–Seattle Sounders rivalry
 Seattle Sounders–Vancouver Whitecaps rivalry
 MLS rivalry cups

References

1975 establishments in Oregon
1975 establishments in British Columbia
Major League Soccer rivalries
Portland Timbers
 
Soccer clubs in Vancouver
Sports in Portland, Oregon